Cameron "Dicker the Kicker" Dicker (born May 6, 2000) is an American football kicker for the Los Angeles Chargers of the National Football League (NFL). He played college football at Texas. He is the first NFL player born in Hong Kong.

Early years
Dicker was born in Hong Kong, and spent the first eleven years of his life in Shanghai where his father worked. He grew up watching soccer and is a fan of Liverpool F.C.

Dicker attended Lake Travis High School in Austin, Texas. During his high school career, Dicker was a two-time all-state selection and was the starting kicker for three seasons, winning the Texas 6A Division I State Championship in 2016. Dicker had 331 points going 34-43 on field goal attempts and 229-232 on extra point attempts. Additionally, Dicker set a Lake Travis high school record with a 53 yard field goal. Dicker was ranked the number four kicker in the nation by 247Sports and the number 16 kicker nationally by ESPN in the 2018 class. On May 4, 2017, Dicker committed to Texas.

College career
Dicker earned immediate playing time at Texas, winning the starting role. He went 18-25 on field goals and 51-52 on extra points earning 2018 second-team all-Big 12 honors. Dicker’s 18 field goals were the most by a freshman in Texas history. He also gained notoriety as “Dicker the Kicker” when he kicked the game winning 40 yard field goal against Oklahoma in the 2018 Red River Showdown. Dicker earned second-team all-Big 12 honors in 2020 and first-team all-Big 12 honors in 2021. He holds the record for the longest field goal in Alamo Bowl history, kicking a 53-yard field goal in the 2020 Alamo Bowl. He added punting duties to his role in the 2021 season. On January 19, 2022, Dicker declared for the NFL Draft.

Professional career

Los Angeles Rams
After going undrafted, Dicker signed with the Los Angeles Rams as an undrafted free agent. He was released on August 16, 2022.

Baltimore Ravens
On August 26, 2022, Dicker was signed by the Baltimore Ravens, but was waived two days later.

Philadelphia Eagles 
On October 4, 2022, Dicker was signed by the Philadelphia Eagles to their practice squad. He made two field goals in his debut against the Arizona Cardinals on October 9, including a game-winning 23-yard kick in the final two minutes. For his performance, he was named NFC Special Teams Player of the Week. He was released by the Eagles on October 29.

Los Angeles Chargers
On November 3, 2022, Dicker was signed to the Los Angeles Chargers practice squad. On November 6, 2022, Dicker made two field goals, including a game-winning 37-yard kick as time expired against the Atlanta Falcons. For his performance, he won his second special teams player of the week award. He is the first rookie kicker to win the Special Teams Player of the Week Award for two different teams, let alone in two conferences. On November 22, 2022, Dicker was signed to the Chargers active roster to replace the injured Dustin Hopkins.  On December 18, Dicker kicked a game-winning field goal against the Tennessee Titans to move the Chargers into a Wild Card position.  He appeared in 11 games as a rookie. He finished converting all 24 extra point attempts and 21 of 22 field goal attempts.

In the Wild Card Round against the Jacksonville Jaguars, Dicker converted all three extra point attempts and three of four field goal attempts in the 31–30 loss.

NFL career statistics

Regular season

|-
! style="text-align:center;" rowspan="2"| 2022
! style="text-align:center;"| PHI
| 1 || 2 || 2 || 100.0% || 0 || 48 || 2 || 2 || 100.0% || 5 || 65.4 || 4 || 8
|-
! style="text-align:center;"| LAC
| 10 || 19 || 20 || 95.0% || 0 || 48 || 22 || 22 || 100.0% || 50 || 63.8 || 42 || 79
|- class="sortbottom"
! colspan="2"| Career || 11 || 21 || 22 || 95.5% || 0 || 48 || 24 || 24 || 100.0% || 55 || 64.0 || 46 || 87
|}

Playoffs

|-
! style="text-align:center;"| 2022
! style="text-align:center;"| LAC
| 1 || 3 || 4 || 75.0% || 0 || 50 || 3 || 3 || 100.0% || 7 || 62.3 || 2 || 12
|- class="sortbottom"
! colspan="2"| Career || 1 || 3 || 4 || 75.0% || 0 || 50 || 3 || 3 || 100.0% || 7 || 62.3 || 2 || 12
|}

References

External links
 Los Angeles Chargers bio
 Texas Longhorns bio

Living people
2000 births
Hong Kong sportspeople
Players of American football from Austin, Texas
American football placekickers
Texas Longhorns football players
Los Angeles Rams players
Baltimore Ravens players
Philadelphia Eagles players
Los Angeles Chargers players
Sportspeople from Shanghai